Diphenyl carbonate is the organic compound with the formula (C6H5O)2CO.  It is classified as an acyclic carbonate ester.  It is a colorless solid.  It is both a monomer in combination with bisphenol A in the production of polycarbonate polymers and a product of the decomposition of polycarbonates.

Production
World production capacity of diphenyl carbonate was 254,000 tonnes in 2002, and phosgenation of phenol is the most significant route. Phosgenation of phenol can proceed under various conditions. The net reaction is as follows:

 2 PhOH + COCl2 → PhOCO2Ph + 2 HCl

The use of phosgene can be avoided by the oxidative carbonylation of phenol with carbon monoxide:

 2 PhOH + CO + [O] → PhOCO2Ph + H2O

Dimethyl carbonate can also be transesterified with phenol:

 CH3OCO2CH3 + 2 PhOH → PhOCO2Ph + 2 MeOH

The kinetics and thermodynamics of this reaction are not favorable. For example, at higher temperatures, dimethyl carbonate undesirably methylates phenol to give anisole.  Despite this, diphenyl carbonate made from non-phosgene sources has become a widely used raw material for the synthesis of bisphenol-A-polycarbonate in a melt polycondensation process.

Applications
Polycarbonates can be prepared by transesterifying diphenyl carbonate with bisphenol A. Phenol is a co-product. These polycarbonates may be recycled by reversing the process: transesterifying the polycarbonate with phenol to yield diphenyl carbonate and bisphenol A.

References

Monomers
Carbonate esters